Mount Kaputar, a mountain with an elevation of  above sea level, is located near Narrabri in northern New South Wales. It is part of the Nandewar Range and has been preserved within the Mount Kaputar National Park. The mountain is a prominent landmark for travellers on the Newell Highway as it rises abruptly from the plains. In the cold of winter the mountain may receive a light dusting of snow.

Access

There is a lookout at the top of the peak called Mount Kaputar Lookout. Nearby is the Governor Lookout and Eckfords Lookout as well as Dawson Spring with cabins, picnic tables and camping facilities.

Geology
Mount Kaputar is the remnants of an extinct volcano that was active about 18 million years ago. Mount Lindesay was probably the centre of the volcano. The predominant vegetation on the mountain is dry sclerophyll forest.

Flora
The main vegetation types are dry rainforests, dry eucalypt forests and heathlands. Here the main vegetation type is open eucalypt forest dominated by snow gum, ribbon gum and mountain gum. Heath occurs in scattered patches where exposure to high winds and shallow soils inhibits the growth of larger trees.

Fauna
This pink species is found only on this single mountaintop. The peak is an isolated habitat island on which endemic invertebrates and plant species have existed for millions of years. According to a park ranger there are three species of cannibal snails on the mountain.

See also 

 List of mountains in New South Wales
 Nandewar Range
 List of volcanoes in Australia

References

External links
 Weather station with webcam, Operated by Oz Forecast

Mountains of New South Wales
Volcanoes of New South Wales
Extinct volcanoes
Miocene volcanism
North West Slopes